Group E of the 1994 FIFA World Cup was one of six groups of four teams competing at the 1994 World Cup in the United States. The first match was played June 18, 1994 and the final games took place simultaneously on June 28, 1994.
The group consisted of Italy, Republic of Ireland,  Mexico, and Norway. Mexico won the group on goals scored. Ireland and Italy also progressed to the knockout rounds, having finished with identical records and the Irish team qualifying in second place as a result of their victory against the Italians. The Italians qualified as the one of the best-scoring third place teams. Norway's shortcomings in attack ultimately let them down, and they exited the tournament with only one goal. It is the only group in World Cup history in which all four teams finished with the same number of points and goal difference.

Standings

Matches
All times local (EDT/UTC–4, CDT/UTC–5, PDT/UTC–7)

Italy vs Republic of Ireland
Ray Houghton's early goal proved the only one of the match where Ireland's defense prevailed over Italy's attack.

Norway vs Mexico

The only goal of the game was scored by Kjetil Rekdal in the 85th minute when the referee let the game continue after a foul on Jan Åge Fjørtoft close to the Mexican penalty area. The goalscorer entered the game minutes before the decisive strike.

Italy vs Norway

Mexico vs Republic of Ireland

Italy vs Mexico

Republic of Ireland vs Norway

See also 
 Loughinisland massacre, that occurred in The Heights Bar in Northern Ireland while patrons were watching the Republic of Ireland vs Italy match

Notes

References

General references

Group E
Republic of Ireland at the 1994 FIFA World Cup
Group
Group
Norway at the 1994 FIFA World Cup